Hubert Cordiez (born 5 December 1954) is a Belgian footballer. He played in one match for the Belgium national football team in 1977.

References

External links
 

1954 births
Living people
Belgian footballers
Belgium international footballers
Place of birth missing (living people)
Association football forwards